The Luy is a left tributary of the Adour, in the Landes, in the Southwest of France.

Geography 
Both rise in Béarn, at the base of the plateau of Ger, east of Pau.

They flow north-west through the Chalosse region and join below the castle of Gaujacq. The Luy flows into the Adour downstream from Tercis-les-Bains (south of Dax).

Départements and towns 

 Luy de France:
 Pyrénées-Atlantiques: Morlaàs, Thèze, Casteide-Candau.
  Luy:
 Landes: Castelnau-Chalosse, Pomarez.

Main tributaries 
 Luy de France:
 (R) Souye, from Espoey.
 (L) Riu Mayou, 
 (L) Arance, 
 Luy :
 (L) Grand Arrigau.
 (R) Arrigau du Gert.

References

Rivers of France
Rivers of Landes (department)
Rivers of Pyrénées-Atlantiques
Rivers of Nouvelle-Aquitaine